Weapon Masters is a television show that was premiered on the Discovery Channel on December 31, 2007, and on the Military Channel.

The hosts, Chad Houseknecht and Mike Loades, a weapons historian, choose a different historical weapon each week. While Loades explores its history — often traveling to the country from which it came to interview modern practitioners — Houseknecht capers about, gibbering and gurning, while attempting to improve on it using modern technology (for example, a pneumatic device was added to a blowgun in one episode). At the end of each episode a challenge test of the new version is held.

Episodes
Source:
 Ep.1 (Roman Scorpion)
 Ep.2 (Greek Fire)
 Ep.3 (Dueling Pistols)
 Ep.4 (Atlatl)
 Ep.5 (Katana)
 Ep.6 (Repeating Crossbow)
 Ep.7 (Rockets)
 Ep.8 (Chakram)
 Ep.9 (Chariot Bow)
 Ep.10 (Blowpipe)

References

External links
 Weapon Masters on the Military Channel
 

Discovery Channel original programming
Television shows about weaponry